Homalocantha secunda is a species of sea snail, a marine gastropod mollusk in the family Muricidae, the murex snails or rock snails.

Description

Distribution

References

 Lamarck, J. B. P. A., 1822 Histoire naturelle des animaux sans vertèbres, vol. 7, p. 711 pp

Muricidae
Gastropods described in 1822